Kao Pan Yu Shi (考槃余事, Desultory Remarks on Furnishing the Abode of the Retired Scholar; also called Art of Refined Living or Pastimes Most Entertaining) is a 1590 compendium on the art of living by Ming dynasty author Tu Long([屠隆).

Desultory Remarks has fifteen treatises:

 Calligraphy and books
 Rubbings
 Paintings
 Paper
 Ink 
 Brushes
 Inkstones
 zither)
 Incense
 Tea
 Potted plants
 Fish and birds
 Mountain studio
 Necessities of life and dress
 Utensils of the studio
 
Art historian Craig Clunas suggests that the Desultory Remarks is essentially a compendium on the art of living gathered from various other existing sources, such as Gao Lian's Eight Treatises on the Nurturing of Life, (for which Tu Long wrote a preface).  Whether or not this is the case, Tu Long's discourses certainly had greater immediate recognition and influence; they were much more widely cited in later collections, and were a primary source for Wen Zhenheng's Treatise of Superfluous Things.

References

Tu Long, Kao Pan Yu Shi Gold Wall Press  2012 304pp (明 屠隆 考槃余事 金城出版社) 

Chinese tea classic texts
1590 books